Zachariah Brigden (December 21, 1734 - March 10, 1787) was a noted American silversmith active in Boston.

Brigden was born in Charlestown, Province of Massachusetts and apprenticed with Thomas Edwards. He was probably free as a journeyman when his master died in 1755, and in 1756 or later married Edwards's daughter Sarah, who was the principal beneficiary of her father's estate. His records, now archived in Beinecke Rare Book and Manuscript Library at Yale University, indicate that his shop employed 15 journeymen and apprentices, doing more business with repairs than in creation of new works. His works are in the collections of the Museum of Fine Arts, Dartmouth College, Yale University, Winterthur Museum, and elsewhere.

References 
 Zachariah Brigden Papers. General Collection, Beinecke Rare Book and Manuscript Library. 
 Earning a Living in Eighteenth-century Boston: Silversmith Zachariah Brigden, Hilary Anderson, dissertation, University of Delaware, 1996.
 American silver at Winterthur, Ian M. G. Quimby, Dianne Johnson, Henry Francis du Pont Winterthur Museum, 1995, page 60.
 Useful beauty: early American decorative arts from St. Louis collections, David H. Conradsen, Patricia E. Kane, St. Louis Art Museum, 1999, page 110.
 Midnight Ride, Industrial Dawn: Paul Revere and the Growth of American Enterprise, Robert Martello, JHU Press, 2010, page 47.
 Ancestry.com entry

1734 births
1787 deaths
American silversmiths